Kyle Sweeney (born April 5, 1981, in Springfield, Pennsylvania) is an American professional lacrosse player who plays for the New York Lizards  in Major League Lacrosse. He is the vice president of sports nutrition at Medifast, and co-founder of the Gotham Lacrosse League.

Sweeney played for the U.S. Men's National Team in the 2006 and 2010 World Lacrosse Championship, and played for Team USA in the 2007 World Indoor Lacrosse Championship.

Personal 
Sweeney is a native of Springfield, Pennsylvania. He is from an athletic family: both his father, Jack, and mother, Denise, are gym teachers, and his brother was an All American athlete in high school. He began playing lacrosse in middle school for the Springfield Athletic Association, and moved on to the Springfield Cougars Lacrosse Club in high school, where he received All-American honors and was the All-Central League MVP. He also played football and basketball.

Sweeney married Angela Lanzafama in 2011.

Collegiate career
Sweeney attended Georgetown University's McDonough School of Business, where he was a three-time All-American long-stick midfielder. As a freshman, he was awarded the 2000 ECAC Rookie of the Year.  He was also named Two-time ECAC Defensive Player of the Year in 2002 and 2001, and was named to the All-ECAC First Team three times. He served as co-captain of the 2003 Georgetown Hoyas men's lacrosse team. Sweeney set the Georgetown all-time record of 229 ground balls while in college. Academically, he was a double major in international business and marketing as well as minor concentration in sociology.

Professional lacrosse career

Major League Lacrosse
Sweeney was selected by the Bridgeport Barrage in the 2003 Collegiate Draft, Round 3. He followed the team when it moved from Bridgeport, Connecticut, to Philadelphia, Pennsylvania, in 2003. Sweeney anchored the defensive unit that helped the Barrage win the MLL championship in 2004, 2006 and 2007. When the team folded in 2008, Sweeney moved to Washington Bayhawks for one game, then over to the Boston Cannons, which he led to win the 2011 MLL Championships. In 2014 he moved back to the Bayhawks, now located in Chesapeake. In 2017, he will begin playing for the New York Lizards.Sweeney has been selected to the MLL All-Star Game nine times, been named All-MLL three times, and has won the Steinfeld Cup four times. He is currently ranked third for all-time games played in the league, as well as eighth for all-time ground balls fielded.

After a fifteen-year career, Sweeney announced his retirement from Major League Lacrosse on August 31, 2017.

National League Lacrosse
The Philadelphia Wings drafted Sweeney in the eighth round (83rd overall) of the 2003 NLL Entry Draft. He followed the team when it moved to Connecticut, changing its name to the New England Black Wolves. He retired from indoor play in 2015.

International career
Sweeney played for the U.S. Men's National Team in the 2006 and 2010. In 2010, his team won the World Lacrosse Championship in Manchester. He also played for Team USA in the 2007 World Indoor Lacrosse Championship.

Sweeney has been described as one of the "best defenders in the game, period", by Inside Lacrosse, which placed him no. 24 on their Top 50 list in 2009.

Business career 
Sweeney was the chief operating officer for Maverick Lacrosse, a New York-based lacrosse equipment manufacturer, from 2005 to 2010. He then moved to Performance Sports Group, where he worked as Vice president of operations and product development until 2013, when he became vice president of marketing and business planning. He left in 2016 to become vice president of sports nutrition at Medifast.

Sweeney co-founded the Gotham Lacrosse League, an elite men's summer league in New York City, with Billy Pymm in 2007. The league expanded to include an elite women's league in 2013.

Statistics

Major League Lacrosse (MLL)

National League Lacrosse (NLL)

NCAA

See also
 Lacrosse in Pennsylvania

References

External links
 Hoya website highschool and college background

1981 births
Living people
American lacrosse players
Edmonton Rush players
Georgetown Hoyas men's lacrosse players
Major League Lacrosse players
National Lacrosse League All-Stars
Philadelphia Wings players
Sportspeople from Delaware County, Pennsylvania
People from Springfield Township, Delaware County, Pennsylvania
McDonough School of Business alumni